Mateja Jeger (born 13 January 1995) is a Croatian table tennis player. Her highest career ITTF ranking was 77.

References

1995 births
Living people
Croatian female table tennis players
21st-century Croatian women